The Canadian Trade Office in Taipei (CTOT;) is Canada's trade office in Taiwan, which functions as a de facto embassy in the absence of official diplomatic relations in which Canada recognized the People's Republic of China in October 1970 in accordance with the one-China policy. The current Executive Director of the Canadian Trade Office in Taipei is Jordan Reeves.

History 
Canada established diplomatic representation with the Republic of China (ROC) in 1942, when it dispatched an ambassador to the temporary capital of Chongqing.  The Canadian embassy was moved to Nanking in 1946, where it remained until the city was taken by Communist forces on 23 April 1949.  Canada chose not to establish an embassy in Taipei, instead maintaining relations through a trade mission in Manila. Canadian citizens in Taiwan received consular assistance from the British consulate.

Canada and the People's Republic of China (PRC) signed a joint communiqué marking the establishment of diplomatic relations on 13 October 1970, in which Canada recognizes the PRC government as the "sole legal government of China" and "takes note" of China's position that Taiwan is an "inalienable part of the territory" of the PRC. It is the position of the PRC government that countries with which it has diplomatic relations may not also maintain official relations with the Republic of China.

The CTOT started operations on 28 November 1986. Staff were initially drawn from the Canadian Chamber of Commerce, but the CTOT is now fully funded by the Government of Canada and staffed by the federal government departments Global Affairs Canada and Citizenship and Immigration Canada. Despite its name, the CTOT does not differ from any other Canadian overseas mission. The CTOT does everything from issuing Canadian passports and providing consular services, to promoting trade and investment cooperation and cultural/educational exchanges. In addition, there are also provincial representatives from the Governments of Alberta and Quebec.

The ROC, likewise, is represented in Canada by the Taipei Economic and Cultural Office in Canada, which has established offices in Ottawa, Toronto and Vancouver. The Taiwan External Trade Development Council (TAITRA) has operated non-governmental trade offices in Canada since the creation of the Far East Trade Services in Montreal in 1970.

List of Executive Directors 

 Robert Kelly (Canadian Chamber of Commerce, 1986-1988);
 John Clayden (Canadian Chamber of Commerce, 1988-1991);
 Ron Berlet (External Affairs Canada 1991-1993, Foreign Affairs Canada 1993 onwards, 1991-1995);
 Hugh Stephens (Foreign Affairs Canada, 1995-1998);
 David Mulroney (Foreign Affairs Canada, 1998-2001); 
 Ted Lipman (Foreign Affairs Canada, 2001-2004);
 Gordon Houlden (Foreign Affairs Canada, 2004-2006);
 Ron MacIntosh (Foreign Affairs Canada, 2006-2009);
 Scott Fraser (Foreign Affairs Canada, 2009-2012);
 Kathleen Mackay (Foreign Affairs Canada, 2012–August 10, 2015);
 Mario Ste-Marie (Global Affairs Canada, 2015-2018);
 Jordan Reeves (Global Affairs Canada, 2018–2022);
 James Stafford Nickel(Global Affairs Canada, 2022-)

Mulroney would later serve as the Canadian Ambassador to the PRC from 2009 to 2012.

Transportation
CTOT is accessible within walking distance south of Taipei City Hall Station of the Taipei Metro.

See also
 List of diplomatic missions in Taiwan
 Foreign relations of Canada
 Foreign relations of Taiwan
 Political status of Taiwan

References

External links
Canadian Trade Office in Taipei (English Version)
Taipei Economic and Cultural Office in Canada (English and French)

Government agencies established in 1986
Taipei
Canada
Canada–Taiwan relations
1986 establishments in Taiwan